Ali Darassa Mahamat (born 22 September 1978), also known as Ali Nassaraza Darassa, Ali Daras, and Ali Ndarass is a Nigerian leader of the Central African rebel group, the Union for Peace in the Central African Republic (UPC), which is dominant around Bambari. He is an ethnic Fula and his UPC is largely Fula. Darassa was the right-hand man of Chadian rebel leader, Abdel Kader Baba-Laddé until Baba-Laddé abandoned his armed struggle in September 2012. The UPC is an Ex-Séléka faction made up of disbanded members of the former rebel coalition known as Séléka. Starting in November 2016, another Ex-Séléka faction, the FPRC, allied with their former enemy, the Anti-balaka, and attacked UPC. The fighting displaced 20,000 and was ethnic in nature with the FPRC singling out Fulani people. He is reportedly well studied in past UN peacekeeping missions in order to deal with the peacekeeping mission known as MINUSCA in the country.

On 17 December 2021, the U.S. Department of the Treasury said in a statement that it was seizing all of Ali Darassa's US assets, and criminalizing transactions with him "for serious human rights abuses", stemming from his leadership of the UPC.

See also
Séléka
Anti-balaka

References

1965 births
Living people
Fula people
People of the Central African Republic Civil War
African warlords
Specially Designated Nationals and Blocked Persons List